Lewis Mills (born 30 May 1989) is a Wales international rugby league footballer who currently plays for the Crusaders in the  Super League, and is dual registered with the South Wales Scorpions in the Championship 1. He signed for the Crusaders, then Celtic Crusaders in 2008, after coming through the youth ranks at the Newport Titans. Mills made his Super League début in 2009's Super League XIV, coming off the bench in a round 24 loss away to Wakefield Trinity Wildcats. He has since played one three more occasions, all of which were substitute appearances. Mills also gained national honours, playing for his native Wales in their European Cup success in 2009.

Background
Lewis Mills was born in Cardiff, Glamorgan, Wales.

References

1989 births
Crusaders Rugby League players
Living people
Rugby league players from Cardiff
Rumney RFC players
South Wales Scorpions players
Wales national rugby league team players
Welsh rugby league players
Rugby league props